Susquehanna International Group, LLP (SIG) is a privately held trading and technology firm. SIG comprises a number of affiliated entities specializing in trading and proprietary investments in equities, fixed income, energy, commodity, index and derivative products, private equity and venture capital, research, customer trading and institutional sales. SIG's operations extend across North America, Europe, and Asia, trading essentially all listed financial products and asset classes, including in Bitcoin since 2016. The firm employs more than 1,900 people and is headquartered in Bala Cynwyd, Pennsylvania, an adjacent suburb of Philadelphia.

History
SIG was founded in 1987 by Jeff Yass, Gerald Yass, Arthur Dantchik, Steve Bloom, Eric Brooks, Andrew Frost and Joel Greenberg. The six co-founders met in the late 1970s at the State University of New York at Binghamton, where they gathered to play cards.

By October 1988, the firm had 100 employees and brought in a revenue of $30 million in its first year.

In 1996, SIG started Heights Capital Management in San Francisco. The firm focuses on PIPE investments in healthcare and technology.

In 2005, SIG launched SIG China, its venture capital operation in China. As of 2022, the firm had invested in over 350 companies with over 70 exits.

In 2006, SIG launched Susquehanna Growth Equity, which invests in software and information services, and offers growth stage funding to companies operating in the US and Israel. At this point, SIG had grown to over 12 offices throughout North America, Europe, and Asia.

Also in 2006, the firm invested in Kuxun, a search engine company, which was sold to Expedia in 2009.

The firm invested $5 million into ByteDance, in 2012, the year the Chinese company was founded. As of 2020, its stake in the owner of TikTok represented 15 percent of its fully-diluted cap table and was valued over $15 billion on paper.

In 2013, SIG acquired market maker G1 Execution Services, LLC (G1X) from E-Trade.

In 2014, SIG expanded its venture capital operations to Japan.

In 2017, SIG launched Susquehanna Private Capital, LLC, which focuses on buyouts of middle market companies in the US, in industries such as aerospace, industrials, consumer, healthcare, and business and government services.

SIG established Dublin-based Nellie Analytics in 2017 to focus on sports betting.

As of 2018, the firm traded about 7 percent of U.S. ETF volume and more than $1.5 trillion in ETFs globally on an annual basis.

As of 2022, the firm had grown to 14 offices worldwide.

Affiliates
 Susquehanna Financial Group (SFG): SIG's institutional broker-dealer business, which provides order execution and trading flow services, and equity research coverage of nearly 200 companies.
 Susquehanna Structured Capital: Structured capital group that provides debt and structured equity investments to middle and lower-middle market companies as well as commercial and multi-family real estate projects.
 Susquehanna Foundation: The corporate foundation of SIG. The foundation is organized as a 501(c)(3) nonprofit and contributes to school reform causes.

Controversies and legal issues

Allegations of front-running client accounts
In 2009, the California Public Employees' Retirement System led a class action lawsuit against SIG and other broker-dealers, including Goldman Sachs, Bank of America, Van der Moolen, and others, for improperly executing trades for their dealer accounts ahead of their clients. The lawsuit reached a settlement in 2012, when the defendants, including SIG, agreed to a $18.5 million settlement.

Allegations of spoofing stock
In 2022, Northwest Biotherapeutics claimed in a suit filed in a Manhattan federal court that SIG, Citadel Securities, Virtu Financial, and other market making firms engaged in repeated spoofing that drove Northwest's share price downward.

References

External links

Companies based in Montgomery County, Pennsylvania
American companies established in 1987
Financial services companies of the United States
1987 establishments in Pennsylvania
Privately held companies based in Pennsylvania
Companies based in Philadelphia